The Estadi Municipal de Futbol de L'Hospitalet is a football stadium located in the Feixa Llarga district of L'Hospitalet de Llobregat, Catalonia, Spain. It was opened in 1999. It has a capacity of 6740 seated spectators. Currently it is the home of football club CE L'Hospitalet.

The stadium was originally built to host the baseball tournament at the 1992 Summer Olympics and designed by Spanish architect Mario Correa. It was later reconverted to a football stadium in 1999.

It is part of a municipal sports complex known as Feixa Llarga - which includes other facilities such as a rugby field and a sports center - and that is why the Municipal Stadium is sometimes referred to as Feixa Llarga. However, the Estadio Municipal de L'Hospitalet should not be confused with the Campo Municipal de la Feixa Llarga, headquarters of the UD Unificación Bellvitge, which is located a few meters away, within the same sports complex.

Prior usage
L'Hospitalet de Llobregat Baseball Stadium was originally a baseball stadium.  The venue, opened in July 1991 and seating 2500, was one of two used for baseball competitions at the 1992 Summer Olympics in Barcelona, including the finals.

During the 1992 games, seating was expanded to just under 7000.

References

External links
Official Site 

Football venues in Catalonia
Buildings and structures in L'Hospitalet de Llobregat
CE L'Hospitalet
Venues of the 1992 Summer Olympics
Olympic baseball venues
Sports venues completed in 1991
1991 establishments in Spain
Sport in L'Hospitalet de Llobregat